Rudra Simhasanam is a Malayalam movie directed by Shibu Gangadharan and written by Sunil Parameshwaran Production controller Sanjay padiyoor Starring Suresh Gopi, Nikki Galrani, Nedumudi Venu, Hari Menon, Kaniha, Nishanth Sagar and  Sudheer Karamana. Rudra Simhasanam released on 31 July 2015. Lyrics written by Jayasree Kishore.

Plot
The story tells about dark magic and coming back to the source of problems to find solace. Other themes that the film explores is greed, illicit relations, betrayal and love in different forms.

Cast
Suresh Gopi as Rudra Simhan 
Nikki Galrani as Haimavathi (later Mrinalini)
Kalabhavan Shajohn as Abdullah, 
Kaniha as Mohini, 
Hari Menon as Unni Raja,
Shweta Menon as Ummayamma, 
Nedumudi Venu as Shiva Thannu
Nishanth Sagar as Harikrishnan,
Sudheer Karamana as Kunnathur Bhairavan,
Devan (actor) as Neelakanda Raja,
Sunil Sukhada as  Advocate Mukkodan

References

2015 films
2010s Malayalam-language films